Elrio van Heerden (born 11 July 1983) is a South African retired footballer who played as a midfielder for the likes of Copenhagen, Club Brugge and Blackburn Rovers, among other clubs. He was previously also been an established member of the South African national team, representing the nation from 2004 to 2009.

Club career
Van Heerden started his career with Glenville Celtic and moved 1998 in the Soccer School of Excellence which was part of the Nelson Mandela Metropolitan University.

FC Copenhagen
He came to Denmark in 2002, where he spent his first two years learning from the older players. Elrio got his debut in 2004 against AaB at Parken Stadium, and the little South African immediately wrote history with his equalizer short before the final whistle. The goal meant, that FC København could secure the championship in the next (and last) round against FC Nordsjælland at Farum Park, which they did with a 4–2 victory.

Club Brugge
A move to Club Brugge was made on 24 January 2006, where he spent two years with the Belgian club scoring two goals from his 67 appearances.

Blackburn Rovers
It was announced on 2 June 2009 that Van Heerden had agreed a two-year deal with the Premier League club Blackburn Rovers, arriving on a free transfer from Club Brugge. He only played two official matches for the club; in the League Cup against Gillingham in the second round, and Chelsea in the quarter-finals, both as a second-half substitute.

On 8 January 2010 it was reported that Elrio was close to signing for Turkish club Sivasspor. Goal.com revealed that Elrio was due to travel to Turkey for a medical ahead of signing on Monday 11 January 2010.

Sivasspor
On 11 January 2010, Blackburn Rovers announced the transfer of the South African midfielder to Sivasspor.

Westerlo
On 27 July 2010, Belgian Pro League side Westerlo announced the signing of Van Heerden.

In November 2012, after having been without a club since the end of the 2011–12 season, Van Heerden had an unsuccessful trial with MLS side Sporting Kansas City.

PE Stars

In 2017, after five years out of the game, van Heerden returned to sign for ABC Motsepe League side PE Stars.

International career
He won 37 full international caps for South Africa, scoring three goals. He represented "Bafana Bafana" at the 2006 Africa Cup of Nations in Egypt, the 2008 Africa Cup of Nations in Ghana and the 2009 FIFA Confederations Cup in South Africa.

International goals

Statistics

References

External links

1983 births
Living people
Cape Coloureds
South African people of Dutch descent
South African soccer players
South Africa international soccer players
South African expatriate soccer players
F.C. Copenhagen players
Club Brugge KV players
Sivasspor footballers
K.V.C. Westerlo players
Association football midfielders
Sportspeople from Port Elizabeth
Danish Superliga players
Süper Lig players
Belgian Pro League players
2009 FIFA Confederations Cup players
2005 CONCACAF Gold Cup players
2006 Africa Cup of Nations players
2008 Africa Cup of Nations players
Blackburn Rovers F.C. players
Expatriate men's footballers in Denmark
Expatriate footballers in England
Expatriate footballers in Turkey
Expatriate footballers in Belgium
South African expatriate sportspeople in Belgium
Lamontville Golden Arrows F.C. players
Soccer players from the Eastern Cape